Diego Rosende Lagos (born 11 February 1986) is a Chilean former professional footballer.

Honours

Club
Universidad Católica
 Primera División (2): 2005 Clausura, 2010

Palestino
Copa Chile (1): 2018

References

External links

1986 births
Living people
People from Santiago
People from Santiago Province, Chile
People from Santiago Metropolitan Region
Footballers from Santiago
Chilean footballers
Club Deportivo Universidad Católica footballers
Coquimbo Unido footballers
Unión Española footballers
Deportes La Serena footballers
Club Deportivo Palestino footballers
Magallanes footballers
Deportes Magallanes footballers
Chilean Primera División players
Primera B de Chile players
Colegio del Verbo Divino alumni
Association football defenders
Association football midfielders